Lyanco Evangelista Silveira Neves Vojnovic (born 1 February 1997), known as Lyanco, is a Brazilian professional footballer who plays as a centre-back for Premier League club Southampton.

Early life 

Lyanco is of Portuguese and Serbian descent. His maternal family has Portuguese roots through his mother Carla. Lyanco's paternal grandfather, Jovan Vojnović, was an ethnic Serb born in the part of the Kingdom of Yugoslavia that is now in present-day Serbia and moved to Brazil at the age of seven, during World War II.

Club career

Early career 
Born in Vitória, Espírito Santo, Lyanco started his youth career at Botafogo.

São Paulo 
In January 2015, he signed a four-year deal with São Paulo. Lyanco made his professional debut as a substitute in a 2–1 win against Atlético Paranaense. He started and played the 90 minutes in his third professional match, a 0–0 draw against Joinville.

Torino 
On 29 March 2017, it was announced that Lyanco had signed a five-year contract with Serie A club Torino, for a reported fee of €6 million plus bonuses. He immediately moved to Turin to begin training with the team, and facilitate his acclimatisation to the club, at the orders of Siniša Mihajlović. His league debut came on 20 September 2017 in a 3–2 victory over Udinese Calcio.

Bologna (loan) 
On 31 January 2019, Lyanco joined Bologna on loan until 30 June 2019.

Southampton 
On 25 August 2021, Lyanco joined Southampton on a four-year deal for an undisclosed fee. On 21 September 2021, Lyanco made his first appearance for Southampton in the EFL Cup against Sheffield United which ended 2–2, with Southampton advancing 4–2 on penalties. On 30 October 2021, Lyanco made his first Premier League appearance, replacing Oriol Romeu in Southampton's 1–0 win against Watford at Vicarage Road.

International career
On 28 January 2016, Lyanco announced on his official Twitter account that he had agreed with officials from the Football Association of Serbia, to represent Serbian youth teams at international level. He featured for Serbia U19 in the qualifiers for the U19 European Championship. Subsequently, he accepted a call up by Brazil U20 boss Rogério Micale and switched his allegiance back to Brazil.

Personal life
Lyanco is married and has a daughter.

Career statistics

Honours
São Paulo U20
U-20 Copa Libertadores: 2016

Brazil U23
Toulon Tournament: 2019

Individual
Toulon Tournament Silver Ball: 2019
Toulon Tournament Best XI: 2019

References

External links

 

1997 births
Living people
People from Vitória, Espírito Santo
Sportspeople from Espírito Santo
Brazilian footballers
Serbian footballers
Association football defenders
Brazil youth international footballers
Serbia youth international footballers
Brazilian people of Serbian descent
Brazilian people of Portuguese descent
Serbian people of Brazilian descent
Serbian people of Portuguese descent
São Paulo FC players
Torino F.C. players
Bologna F.C. 1909 players
Southampton F.C. players
Campeonato Brasileiro Série A players
Serie A players
Premier League players
Brazilian expatriate footballers
Brazilian expatriate sportspeople in Italy
Expatriate footballers in Italy
Brazilian expatriate sportspeople in England
Expatriate footballers in England